A valvetrain or valve train is a mechanical system that controls the operation of the intake and exhaust valves in an internal combustion engine. The intake valves control the flow of air/fuel mixture (or air alone for direct-injected engines) into the combustion chamber, while the exhaust valves control the flow of spent exhaust gasses out of the combustion chamber once combustion is completed.

Layout
The valvetrain layout is largely dependent on the location of the camshaft. The common valvetrain configurations for piston engines - in order from oldest to newest - are:
 Flathead engine: The camshaft and the valves are located in the engine block below the combustion chamber.
 Overhead valve engine: The camshaft remains in the block, however the valves are located in the cylinder head above the combustion chamber.
 Overhead camshaft engine: The valves and camshaft(s) are in the cylinder head above the combustion chamber.

Components 
The valvetrain consists of all the components responsible for transferring the rotational movement of the camshaft into the opening and closing of the intake and exhaust valves. Typical components are listed below in order from the crankshaft to the valves.

Camshaft 
The timing and lift profile of the valve opening events are controlled by the camshaft(s), through use of a carefully shaped lobe on a rotating shaft. The camshaft is driven by the crankshaft and— in the case of a four-stroke engine— rotates at half the speed of the crankshaft.

Motion is transferred from the crankshaft to the camshaft most commonly by a rubber timing belt, a metallic timing chain or a set of gears.

Pushrod 
Pushrods are long, slender metal rods that are used in overhead valve engines to transfer motion from the camshaft (located in the engine block) to the valves (located in the cylinder head). The bottom end of a pushrod is fitted with a lifter, upon which the camshaft makes contact. The camshaft lobe moves the lifter upwards, which moves the pushrod. The top end of the pushrod pushes on the rocker arm, which opens the valve.

Rocker arm / Finger / Bucket tappet 
Depending on the design used, the valves are actuated by a rocker arm, finger or bucket tappet. Overhead valve engines use rocker arms, which are actuated from below indirectly (through the pushrods) by the cam lobes. Overhead camshaft engines use fingers or bucket tappets, which are actuated from above directly by the cam lobes.

Valves 
Most modern engines use poppet valves, although sleeve valves, slide valves and rotary valves have also been used at times. Poppet valves are typically opened by the camshaft lobe or rocker arm, and closed by a coiled spring called a valve spring. 

Valve float occurs when the valve spring is unable to control the inertia of the valvetrain at high engine speeds (RPM).

See also
 Cam-in-block
 Camless piston engine

References

 
 
Engine components